Black Lady is a studio album by the Serbian rock band Smak, released in 1978. It is the English-language version of their second album, Crna dama.  The album was recorded and mixed in London.

Track listing

Personnel 
 Boris Aranđelović - vocals
 Radomir Mihajlović "Točak" - guitar
 Miodrag Petkovski "Miki" - keyboards
 Zoran Milanović - bass
 Slobodan Stojanović "Kepa" - drums

Guest
 Maurice Pert - percussion

The Harmonium Quartet
 Pat Nalling - first violin
 John Knight - second violin
 Brian Mack - viola
 Ben Kennard - cello

External links

Smak albums
1978 albums